Velliyamattom  is a village in Idukki district in the Indian state of Kerala.

Demographics
 India census, Velliyamattom had a population of 19,970 with 9,925 males and 10,045 females.

References

Villages in Idukki district